Ivan Beswick (2 January 1936 – 4 June 2012) was an English footballer who played as a full-back.

Club career
Born in New Moston, Manchester, Beswick was signed as a sixteen year old by Manchester United in 1952. After appearing in the FA Youth Cup alongside Manchester United legends Duncan Edwards, David Pegg and Eddie Colman, Beswick was released by coach Jimmy Murphy in 1957, having collapsed for a third time due to internal bleeding caused by a perforated ulcer. 

After surgery to remove the ulcers, Beswick joined Oldham Athletic in 1958, and went on to make 49 appearances in all competitions. He later played for Stalybridge Celtic.

Personal life
Following his retirement, Beswick went on to study engineering at The University of Manchester and University of Salford. He founded Safeline, a metal detector company, in 1988.

He died on 4 June 2012 after suffering a stroke.

References

1936 births
2012 deaths
Footballers from Manchester
English footballers
Association football defenders
Manchester United F.C. players
Oldham Athletic A.F.C. players
Stalybridge Celtic F.C. players